Riedern am Wald is an Ortsteil of the municipality of Ühlingen-Birkendorf in the Waldshut district of Baden-Württemberg, Germany. Notable people from the area include artist Heinrich Ernst Kromer and Pope Benedict XVI's personal secretary, Msgr. Georg Gänswein.

External links
 Official website 

Waldshut (district)
Baden
Towns in Baden-Württemberg